The women's triple jump competition at the 1998 Asian Games in Bangkok, Thailand was held on 18 December at the Thammasat Stadium. It was the first time that this event was contested at the Asian Games.

Schedule
All times are Indochina Time (UTC+07:00)

Results

References

External links
Results

Women's triple jump
1998